The Eurasian hobby (Falco subbuteo) or just hobby, is a small, slim falcon. It belongs to a rather close-knit group of similar falcons often considered a subgenus Hypotriorchis.

Taxonomy and systematics
The first formal description of the Eurasian hobby was by the Swedish naturalist Carl Linnaeus in 1758 in the tenth edition of his Systema Naturae under the present binomial name Falco subbuteo. The genus name falco derives from Late Latin falx, falcis, a sickle, referring to the wing profile of the bird. The species name subbuteo is from Latin sub, "below, less than, under" and buteo, "buzzard". The species' English name comes from Old French hobé or hobet. It became the trademark for the Subbuteo games company after its creator, who was an ornithologist, was refused permission to register "Hobby".

Currently two subspecies are recognized:
 F. s. subbuteo: the nominate race is resident in Africa, Europe and Central and East Asia, winters in Central and South Africa and South Asia
 F. s. streichi: described by Hartert and Neumann in 1907, is smaller in size and is found further east of F. s. subbuteos distribution range

Description
Adults are slate-grey above with a dark crown and two short black moustachial stripes. The throat is unstreaked white, thighs and undertail coverts are unstreaked rufous and rest of the underparts are whitish with black streaks. Close views enable the red "trousers" and vent to be seen. Sexes are similar. Juveniles are generally much browner, with scaled upper parts and streaked buffy thighs and undertail coverts.

The hobby has a distinct first-summer plumage.

Distribution and status
This species breeds across the Palearctic realm. It is a long-distance migrant, wintering in Africa and Asia.

Behaviour and ecology

It is a bird of open country such as farmland, marshes, taiga and savannah. They are widespread in lowlands with scattered small woods. It is an elegant bird of prey, appearing sickle-like in flight with its long pointed wings and square tail, often resembling a swift when gliding with folded wings. It is fast and powerful in flight and will take large insects, such as dragonflies, which it transfers from talons to beak and eats while soaring slowly in circles. It also captures small bats and small birds in flight. Its speed and aerobatic skills enable it to take swallows and even swifts on the wing, and barn swallows or house martins have a characteristic "hobby" alarm call. It is known to harass swallows while they are roosting and dispersing from roosts. When not breeding, it is crepuscular, hawking principally in the mornings and evenings. While on migration, they may move in small groups.

Hobbies nest in old nests of crows and other birds. The tree selected is most often one in a hedge or on the extreme edge of a spinney, from where the bird can observe intruders from a considerable distance. It lays 2–4 eggs. Incubation is said to take 28 days and both parents share in this duty, though the female does the greater part.

It is a very bold and courageous bird and was used in falconry, trained to hawk birds like quails, larks, hoopoes, drongos, etc.

Gallery

References

External links

 Eurasian Hobby or Hobby Falcon species text in The Atlas of Southern African Birds
 Ageing and sexing (PDF; 5.7 MB) by Javier Blasco-Zumeta & Gerd-Michael Heinze
 
 
 
 
 
 

Eurasian hobby
Birds of prey of Eurasia
Birds of Africa
Eurasian hobby
Eurasian hobby